Charlie Worsham (born September 1, 1985) is an American country music singer, songwriter and actor. He is signed to Warner Bros. Records. Charlie is currently a member of Dierks Bentley's tour band. He is a former member of the band Old Crow Medicine Show.

Musical career
Worsham was born in Jackson, Mississippi, and grew up in Grenada, Mississippi. The Mississippi Senate recognized Worsham in 1999 for his outstanding musical accomplishments, as well as being "a model student who makes straight A's". Worsham attended Grenada High School, and then Berklee College of Music in Boston.

Worsham joined the band KingBilly, singing harmonies and playing mandolin until 2010; the band recorded an extended play, "Waiting On You". Though the band received some local fame in Nashville and a featured spot on Great American Country’s GAC Minute, they never broke through to mainstream radio, and disbanded in 2012 with all members pursuing solo careers.

Worsham toured with Taylor Swift in 2011, and has opened for performers such as Miranda Lambert and Wade Bowen.  He opened for Brad Paisley and Randy Houser in 2014. In 2016 it was announced he would be opening some shows during the final world tour of Kenny Rogers.

"Could It Be" (2013) 
He released his debut single, "Could It Be", for Warner Bros. Records in 2013. The song appears on his debut album Rubberband, released on August 20, 2013.  The album features Vince Gill and Marty Stuart on one of the tracks, "Tools of the Trade". The album's second single, "Want Me Too", was released in late 2013.

Beginning of Things (2017) 
Worsham's second album, Beginning of Things, was released on April 21, 2017. "Cut Your Groove" was released as the album's lead single. Worsham did not release any new content until April 2021 when he issued a single titled "Fist Through This Town". This was followed by an EP titled Sugarcane in July of the same year.

Discography

Studio albums

Extended plays

Singles

Music videos

Notes

References

1985 births
21st-century American singers
20th-century American singers
American country singer-songwriters
American male singer-songwriters
American mandolinists
American country banjoists
American country guitarists
American male guitarists
Living people
Musicians from Jackson, Mississippi
Warner Records artists
Singer-songwriters from Mississippi
American country mandolinists
20th-century American guitarists
21st-century American guitarists
Guitarists from Mississippi
Country musicians from Mississippi
Country musicians from Tennessee
20th-century American male singers
21st-century American male singers
Singer-songwriters from Tennessee